Altostratus is a middle-altitude cloud genus made up of water droplets, ice crystals, or a mixture of the two. Altostratus clouds are formed when large masses of warm, moist air rise, causing water vapor to condense. Altostratus clouds are usually gray or blueish featureless sheets, although some variants have wavy or banded bases. The sun can be seen through thinner altostratus clouds, but thicker layers can be quite opaque.

Altostratus clouds usually predict the arrival of warm fronts. Once altostratus clouds associated with a warm front arrive, continuous rain or snow will usually follow in the next 12 to 24 hours. Although altostratus clouds predict the arrival of warmer, wetter weather, they themselves do not produce significant precipitation. Thunderstorms can be embedded in altostratus clouds; however, bringing showers.

Because altostratus clouds can contain ice crystals, they can produce some optical phenomena like iridescence and coronas.

Description 

Altostratus clouds are generally gray or blue-tinged with a largely-uniform blanket-like appearance. They do not have distinct features, and usually do not produce precipitation. The name "altostratus" comes from the conjugation of the Latin words "altum", meaning "high", and "stratus", meaning "flat" or "spread out". Altostratus clouds can produce virga, causing the cloud base to appear hazy. While they do not produce significant precipitation, altostratus clouds can cause light sprinkles or even small rain showers. Consistent rainfall and lowering of the cloud base causes altostratus to become nimbostratus.

Unlike most other types of clouds, altostratus clouds are not subdivided into cloud species due to their largely-featureless appearance. However, they still appear in five varieties: Altostratus duplicatus, opacus, radiatus, translucidus, and undulatus. Altostratus duplicatus is a rare form of altostratus clouds composed of two or more layers of cloud. Translucidus is a translucent form of altostratus clouds, meaning that the sun or moon can be seen through the cloud, whereas the opacus variety is opaque. Radiatus is another rare variety. It has parallel bands of cloud that stretch toward the horizon. The undulatus variety has an wavy appearance—the underside of the cloud appears to rise and fall.

Altostratus and altocumulus clouds, both of which are mid-level clouds, are commonly measured together in cloud cover studies. Together, they cover around 25% of the Earth's surface on average based on CALIPSO satellite data. This constitutes roughly one third of the Earth's total cloud cover. By itself, separated from altocumulus, altostratus covers ~16% of the Earth's surface. Altostratus cloud cover varies seasonally in temperate regions, with significantly less coverage in the summer months as compared to the other seasons. Additionally, altostratus cloud cover varies by latitude, with tropical regions having vastly fewer altostratus clouds when compared to temperate or polar regions. Altostratus and altocumulus cover roughly 22% of the ocean's surface based on surface measurements, with minimal variation based on season.

Altostratus clouds are warmest at the bottom and coldest at the top, with a fairly consistent lapse rate of 5 to 7 °C per kilometer (14 to 20 °F per mile) inside the cloud. The lapse rate is the rate at which the temperature decreases with altitude. Higher lapse rates (i.e. the faster temperature drops with increasing altitude) were associated with colder clouds. Warmer temperatures occurred during summer and colder temperatures during winter.

Inside altostratus clouds, the relative humidity is generally greatest towards the top of the cloud decreasing slowly and roughly linearly towards the bottom. The lowest part of the cloud has the lowest relative humidity. Below the bottom of the cloud, the relative humidity drops rapidly.

Microphysical properties 
Altostratus can be composed of water droplets, supercooled water droplets, and ice crystals, but ice crystals make up the vast majority. In some altostratus clouds made of ice crystals, very thin horizontal sheets of water droplets can appear seemingly at random, but they quickly disappear. The sizes of the ice crystals in the cloud tended to increase as altitude decreased. However, close to the bottom of the cloud, the particles decreased in size again. During the sampling of one cloud, the scientists noted a halo while flying near the top of the cloud, which indicated that the ice crystals were hexagonal near the top. However, farther down, the ice crystals became more conglomerated. Mixed-phase (containing both ice and water) altostratus clouds contain a "melt layer", below which the ice crystals tend to melt into water droplets. These water droplets are spheres and thus fall much faster than ice crystals, collecting at the bottom of the cloud.

Formation 

Altostratus clouds form when a large mass of warm air rises, causing water vapor in the atmosphere to condense onto nuclei (small dust particles), forming water droplets and ice crystals. These conditions usually happen at the leading edge of a warm front, where cirrostratus clouds thicken and lower until they transition into altostratus clouds. Alternatively, nimbostratus clouds can thin into altostratus. Altostratus can even form from the spreading of the upper anvil cloud or the middle column of a thunderstorm.

Use in forecasting 

Altostratus clouds tend to form ahead of warm fronts or occluded fronts and herald their arrival. These warm fronts bring warmer air into the region. Occluded fronts form when a faster-moving cold front catches up to a warm front, and the temperature after the frontal system passes may rise or fall. As the frontal system approaches, cirrostratus clouds will thicken into altostratus clouds, which then gradually thicken further into nimbostratus clouds. If the frontal system is occluded, cumulonimbus clouds may also be present. Once the altostratus clouds have arrived, rain or snow will usually follow in the next 12 to 24 hours.

Instability in the atmosphere can embed thunderstorms in an altostratus cloud, although altostratus clouds themselves do not produce storms.

Effects on climate 
However, at the same time, they reflect around 30 watts per square meter of long-wave (infrared) black body radiation emitted by the Earth back to Earth's surface, heating the Earth by around —a process called the greenhouse effect. Cirrus and altostratus clouds are the top two sources of this heating effect.

Altostratus clouds are the only cloud genus besides cirrus clouds to exhibit a net global heating effect on Earth and its atmosphere; however, cirrus have a heating effect that is four times as potent as altostratus (2 watts per square meter versus only 0.5 watts per square meter).

Optical phenomena 
Altostratus clouds can produce bright halos when viewed from the air, but not when viewed from the ground. Halos can take the appearance of rings, arcs, or spots of white or multicolored light and are formed by the reflection and refraction of sunlight or moonlight shining through ice crystals in the cloud. Light diffraction through altostratus clouds can also produce coronas, which are small, concentric pastel-colored rings of light around the sun or moon. They can also be iridescent, with often-parallel bands of bright color projected on a cloud. Unlike the halos, the coronas and iridescence can be seen from Earth's surface.

Relation to other clouds 

These are given the prefix "alto-". These clouds are formed from ice crystals, supercooled water droplets, or liquid water droplets.

Above the mid-level clouds are three different genera of high-level clouds, cirrus, cirrocumulus, and cirrostratus, all of which are given the prefix "cirro-". High-level clouds usually form above . Cirrocumulus and cirrostratus are sometimes informally referred to as cirriform clouds because of their frequent association with cirrus.

Below the mid-level clouds are the low-level clouds, which usually form below  and do not have a prefix. The two genera that are strictly low-level are stratus, and stratocumulus. These clouds are composed of water droplets, except during winter when they are formed of supercooled water droplets or ice crystals if the temperature at cloud level is below freezing. Three additional genera usually form in the low altitude range, but may be based at higher levels under conditions of very low humidity. They are the genera cumulus, and cumulonimbus, and nimbostratus. These are sometimes classified separately as clouds of vertical development, especially when their tops are high enough to be composed of supercooled water droplets or ice crystals.

Cirrostratus 

Cirrostratus clouds can appear as a smooth veil in the sky or as a striated sheet. They are sometimes similar to altostratus and are distinguishable from the latter because the sun or moon is always clearly visible through transparent cirrostratus, in contrast to altostratus which tends to be opaque or translucent. Cirrostratus come in two species, fibratus and nebulosus. The ice crystals in these clouds vary depending upon the height in the cloud. These clouds commonly produce halos, and sometimes the halo is the only indication that such clouds are present. They are formed by warm, moist air being lifted slowly to a very high altitude. When a warm front approaches, cirrostratus clouds become thicker and descend forming altostratus clouds, and rain usually begins 12 to 24 hours later.

Altocumulus 

Altocumulus clouds are small patches or heaps of white or light gray cloud. Like altostratus, altocumulus are composed of a mixture of water droplets, supercooled water droplets, and ice crystals. Although altocumulus clouds are mid-level clouds that form at roughly the same altitude as altostratus clouds, their formation methods are completely different. Altocumulus forms from convective (rising) processes, whereas altostratus is usually formed by descending and thickening cirrostratus.

Stratus 

Stratus are low-level clouds that are usually visually similar to altostratus. Stratus comes in two species: nebulosus, a largely-featureless flat gray cloud sheet, and fractus, shattered fragments of cloud often called "scud". Opaque varieties of altostratus and stratus nebulosus clouds can be virtually indistinguishable from each other to the naked eye, to the point that the World Meteorological Organization suggests that one of the few ways to distinguish between these clouds is to check what types of clouds came before them. Altostratus clouds, because they tend to form from warm fronts, are usually preceded by high-level cirriform clouds. Stratus clouds tend to form by cooling air masses, often at night, and thus are not usually preceded by other types of clouds.

Nimbostratus 

Nimbostratus are low-level (sometimes classified as vertical) rain-bearing stratus clouds. Unlike the sprinkles or light drizzles that altostratus or stratus can produce, nimbostratus produces heavy, continuous rain or snow. These clouds are thick and dark enough to entirely blot out the sun. Nimbostratus has no species or varieties. Like altostratus, nimbostratus clouds can be made of ice crystals, supercooled water droplets, or water droplets.

See also

List of cloud types

Notes

Sources 
 Footnotes

 Bibliography
 
 

 
 
 
 
 
 
 
 
 
 
 
 

Stratus
Cloud types